Ernst Heymann (6 April 1870 - 2 March 1946) was a German jurist from Berlin. In 1889 he put on Breslauer Mary Magdalene School from the matriculation examination. He then studied law at the Silesian Friedrich-Wilhelm University in Breslau until 1892. Heymann was appointed professor at the Friedrich-Wilhelms-Universität zu Berlin in 1899. In 1902 he was appointed to the Chair of Law at the Albertus University of Königsberg, two years later he moved to the University of Marburg. In 1914 he returned to Berlin at the Friedrich Wilhelm University.

Since 1918 Heymann was a regular member of the Prussian Academy of Sciences. From 1926 to 1938 he was secretary of the Philosophical and Historical Class of the Academy. He acted as vice president from 1939 to 1942. Heymann was longtime chairman of the Academy commissions "German Law Dictionary", "German Commission" and " Vocabularium Iurisprudentiae Romanae " and justice expert of the Academy.

Since 1926, Heymann was scientific adviser to the Institute for Comparative and International Private Law of the Kaiser Wilhelm Society for the Advancement of Science, today's 'Max Planck Society'. From 1937 to 1946 he was Director of the Institute and Scientific Member of the Kaiser Wilhelm Society. [1] From 1929 to 1932, again from 1943 Heymann Member of the Senate of the Kaiser Wilhelm Society.Heymann was - until 1938, first as acting - successor Ernst Rabel, who had been forced by the Nazi regime to resign his post. During the evacuation of Berlin, he moved in 1944 with the staff of the institute of Tübingen. From 1931 and 1933 Heymann was President of the Law Society of Berlin. He was also a member of the Central Board and Director of "Leges" the Monumenta Germaniae Historica. After the "seizure" of the Nazis, he was in May 1934 the founding members of the Committee on Legal Philosophy within the Nazi Academy of German Law. [2] In 1939 was Heymann started a Festschrift for the leader's 50th birthday. [2]

Heymann was a Perpetual Secretary of the Prussian Academy of Sciences in 1933 when, on two occasions, he wrote several missives castigating Albert Einstein following Einstein's resignation from the Academy. Ideas And Opinions, by Albert Einstein, 1954, p205-209.

He activated at "Monumenta Germaniae Historica", etc.

Literary works
 Englisches Privatrecht, 1904
 Das ungarische Privatrecht, 1917
 Handelsgesetzbuch, 1926
 Handelsrecht, 1938

External links
 

Jurists from Berlin
Academic staff of the Humboldt University of Berlin
Academic staff of the University of Königsberg
Academic staff of the University of Marburg
Members of the Prussian Academy of Sciences
University of Breslau alumni
Writers from Berlin
People from the Province of Brandenburg
1870 births
1946 deaths
German male writers
Max Planck Institute directors